2017 Tour des Fjords was the fifth edition of the Tour des Fjords cycle stage race. The race was won by Norwegian  racer Edvald Boasson Hagen.

Teams
Twenty teams were invited to start the race. These included three UCI WorldTeams, eight UCI Professional Continental teams and nine UCI Continental teams.

Schedule

Stages

Stage 1
24 May 2017 – Balestrand to Førde,

Stage 2
25 May 2017 – Gulen to Norheimsund,

Stage 3
26 May 2017 – Odda to Karmøy,

Stage 4
27 May 2017 – Stavanger to Sandnes,

Stage 5
28 May 2017 – Hinna to Stavanger,

Classification leadership table
In the 2017 Tour des Fjords, four different jerseys were awarded. The general classification was calculated by adding each cyclist's finishing times on each stage, and allowing time bonuses for the first three finishers at intermediate sprints (three seconds to first, two seconds to second and one second to third) and at the finish of mass-start stages; these were awarded to the first three finishers on all stages: the stage winner won a ten-second bonus, with six and four seconds for the second and third riders respectively. The leader of the classification received a yellow jersey; it was considered the most important of the 2017 Tour des Fjords, and the winner of the classification was considered the winner of the race.

There was also a mountains classification, the leadership of which was marked by a polka-dot jersey. In the mountains classification, points towards the classification were won by reaching the top of a climb before other cyclists. Each climb was categorised as either first, second, or third-category, with more points available for the higher-categorised climbs.

Additionally, there was a points classification, which awarded a blue jersey. In the points classification, cyclists received points for finishing in the top 10 in a stage. For winning a stage, a rider earned 20 points, with 16 for second, 14 for third and so on, down to 1 point for 10th place. Points towards the classification could also be accrued – awarded on a 6–4–2 scale – at intermediate sprint points during each stage; these intermediate sprints also offered bonus seconds towards the general classification as noted above.

The fourth and final jersey represented the classification for young riders, marked by a white jersey. This was decided the same way as the general classification, but only riders born after 1 January 1995 were eligible to be ranked in the classification. There was also a classification for teams, in which the times of the best three cyclists per team on each stage were added together; the leading team at the end of the race was the team with the lowest total time.

Final standings

General classification

Points classification

Mountains classification

Young rider classification

Teams classification

References

External links

2017
2017 in Norwegian sport
2017 UCI Europe Tour